The Spingarn Medal is awarded annually by the National Association for the Advancement of Colored People (NAACP) for an outstanding achievement by an African American. The award was created in 1914 by Joel Elias Spingarn, chairman of the board of directors of the NAACP. It was first awarded to biologist Ernest E. Just in 1915, and has been given most years thereafter.

At its annual convention, the NAACP presents the award after deciding from open nominations. Should the organization end, it would be managed by Howard or Fisk Universities. The gold medal is valued at $100, and Spingarn left $20,000 in his will for the NAACP to continue giving it indefinitely.

List of recipients

Notes
Footnotes

Specific references

General references

 
 

Awards established in 1915
American awards
Awards honoring African Americans
1915 establishments in the United States
NAACP